There are 151 colleges affiliated to the University of Kerala, which is in Thiruvananthapuram in the state of Kerala, India. This list is categorised into two main parts, Autonomous colleges and Non-Autonomous colleges. Autonomous colleges are bestowed academic independence, primarily in order to enhance the level of education in those colleges.

A college may be classified as government run, private unaided, or private aided. A government college receives full funding from the Government of Kerala, while a private unaided college receives no funding from the government. In a private aided college, one or more of its courses receives partial funding from the government.

Affiliated colleges

Architecture colleges

Autonomous colleges
Mar Ivanios College
Nalanchira

Fatima Matha National College
Kollam

Assumption College
Chanaganacherry

CMS College
Kottayam

Maharaja’s College
Ernakulam

Mar Athanasious College
Kothamangalam

Marian College
Kuttikkanam

Rajagiri College of Social Sciences 
Kalamassery

Sacred Heart College
Thevara

St. Albert's College
Ernakulam

St. Berchmans College
Changanassery

St. Teresa's College
Ernakulam

Christ College, Irinjalakuda
Irinjalakuda

Farook College
Calicut

M.E.S. Mampad College

St. Joseph's College, Devagiri
Calicut

St. Joseph's College, Irinjalakuda 
Thrissur

St. Thomas College
Thrissur

Vimala College, Engineering College

Mar Baselios College of Engineering and technology,Nalanchira

Engineering colleges
The only engineering college affiliated to university of Kerala is University College of Engineering, Kariavattom. From the academic year 2015-16, all other colleges affiliated to the University of Kerala except UCEK are now affiliated to KTU.

M B A colleges

References 

Colleges Affiliated
Affiliated
Kerala